Parisian Life (French: La vie parisienne) is a 1977 historical musical comedy film directed by Christian-Jaque and starring Martine Sarcey, Evelyne Buyle and Dany Saval. A co-production between France, Italy and West Germany, it is based on the 1882 operetta La Vie parisienne by Jacques Offenbach.

It was partly shot at the Bavaria Studios in Munich.

Cast
 Martine Sarcey as La baronne 
 Evelyne Buyle as La Gantière: Gabrielle 
 Dany Saval as Pauline 
 Claire Vernet as Metella 
 Jacques Balutin as Urbain 
 Bernard Alane as Raoul de Gardefeu 
 Georges Aminel as Le Brésilien 
 Claudine Collas as Valentine 
 Georges Croce as Bobinet 
 Jean-Pierre Darras as Le baron 
 Valentine Ducray as Léonie 
 Christian Duvaleix as Le bottier Frick 
 Jacques Dynam as Prosper 
 Grégoire Gromoff as Igor 
 Jacques Jouanneau as Alfred 
 Jacques Legras as Alphonse 
 Colin Mann as Worth 
 Aurora Maris as Louise 
 Jean-Claude Massoulier as Joseph 
 Michèle Mellory as Clara 
 Jean-Pierre Rambal as Hippolyte 
 Olga Valéry as La duchesse

References

Bibliography 
 Goble, Alan. The Complete Index to Literary Sources in Film. Walter de Gruyter, 1999.

External links 
 

1977 films
1970s musical comedy films
1970s historical comedy films
French musical comedy films
French historical comedy films
Italian musical comedy films
Italian historical comedy films
German musical comedy films
German historical comedy films
West German films
1970s French-language films
Films directed by Christian-Jaque
Films set in Paris
Films set in the 19th century
Operetta films
Films based on operettas
Films shot at Bavaria Studios
Italian historical musical films
1970s French films
1970s Italian films
1970s German films
French-language German films
French-language Italian films